Francesco Maria De Regi (Milan, 1720 – 1794) was an Italian mathematician.

He was a Barnabite priest. He worked particularly on hydraulic engineering. At twenty-four he took the chair of mathematics, specially created for him, in the school of the Collegio of Sant'Alessandro in Milan.

Works

References

External links 
 

1720 births
1794 deaths
18th-century Italian mathematicians
Barnabites
Hydraulic engineers
Scientists from Milan